The Manus languages are a subgroup of about two dozen Oceanic languages located on Manus Island and nearby offshore islands in Manus Province of Papua New Guinea. The exact number of languages is difficult to determine because they form a dialect continuum (Blust 2007:302). The name Manus (or Moanus) originally designated an ethnic group whose members spoke closely related languages and whose coastal dwellers tended to build their houses on stilts out over the sea (Bowern 2011:6).

Nowadays the whole population of Manus Province may call themselves 'Manus' people, so the original Manus are distinguished as Manus tru 'real Manus' (or 'Manus sensu stricto'). The language of the Manus people most intensively studied by anthropologists, from Georg Thilenius in the early 1900s through Margaret Mead in the mid-1900s, is now called Titan (Bowern 2011).

Languages
According to Lynch, Ross, & Crowley (2002), the structure of the family is:

Manus
West Manus: Nyindrou, Sori-Harengan, Hermit (†), Bipi; Mondropolon, Tulu-Bohuai, Khehek (Drehet, Levei), Likum
Intermediate: Loniu–Mokerang, Pak-Tong
East Manus: Andra-Hus, Elu, Leipon, Papitalai, Ponam, Ere–Kele–Kurti, Koro–Lele–Nali–Titan

One very distinctive phonological trait of these languages is the presence of prenasalized trills (Blust 2007). The bilabial trill , which can be spelled mb or br, only occurs before , and sounds like  in other environments. The alveolar trill , spelled ndr or dr, has no such distributional limitations (2007:303).

References

 Blust, Robert (2007). The prenasalised trills of Manus. In Language description, history, and development: Linguistic indulgence in memory of Terry Crowley, ed. by Jeff Siegel, John Lynch, and Diana Eades, pp. 297–311. Creole Language Library vol. 30. Amsterdam: John Benjamins.
 Bowern, Claire (2011). Sivisa Titan: Sketch grammar, texts, vocabulary based on material collected by P. Josef Meier and Po Minis. Oceanic Linguistics Special Publication No. 38. Honolulu: University of Hawai‘i Press.
 Hamel, Patricia J. (1994). A grammar and lexicon of Loniu, Papua New Guinea. Pacific Linguistics C-103. Canberra: The Australian National University. 275 pp.
 Hamel, Patricia J. (1993). Serial verbs in Loniu and an evolving preposition. Oceanic Linguistics 32:111–132.
 Lynch, John, Malcolm Ross, Terry Crowley (2002). The Oceanic languages. Richmond, Surrey: Curzon. , OCLC 48929366.
 Ohnemus, Sylvia (1998). An Ethnology of the Admiralty Islanders: The Alfred Bühler Collection, Museum der Kulturen, Basel. Honolulu: University of Hawai‘i Press. .
 Ross, M. D. (1988). Proto Oceanic and the Austronesian languages of Western Melanesia. Pacific Linguistics C-98. Canberra: The Australian National University. 487 pp.

 
Admiralty Islands languages
Languages of Manus Province